The city of Gainesville is the county seat of Hall County, Georgia, United States. As of the 2020 census, the city had a population of 42,296. Because of its large number of poultry processing plants, it is often called the "Poultry Capital of the World." Gainesville is the principal city of the Gainesville, Georgia Metropolitan Statistical Area, which is included in the Atlanta–Sandy Springs–Gainesville, Georgia Combined Statistical Area.

History
Gainesville was established as "Mule Camp Springs" by European-American settlers in the early 1800s. Less than three years after the organization of Hall County on December 15, 1818, Mule Camp Springs was renamed "Gainesville" on April 21, 1821. It was named in honor of General Edmund P. Gaines, a hero of the War of 1812 and a noted military surveyor and road-builder. Gainesville was selected to be the county seat and chartered by the Georgia General Assembly on November 30, 1821.

A gold rush that began in nearby Lumpkin County in the 1830s resulted in an increase in the number of settlers and the beginning of a business community. In the middle of the 19th century, Gainesville had two important events. In 1849, it became established as a resort center, with people attracted to the springs. In 1851, much of the small city was destroyed by fire.

After the Civil War, Gainesville began to grow from 1870. In 1871 The Atlanta and Richmond Air-Line Railway, later re-organized into The Atlanta and Charlotte Air Line Railroad, began to stop in Gainesville, increasing its ties to other markets and stimulating business and population. It grew from 1,000 in 1870, to over 5,000 by 1900.

By 1898, textile mills had become the primary driver of the economy, with the railroad integral to delivering raw cotton and carrying away the mills' products. With the revenues generated by the mills, in 1902, Gainesville became the first city south of Baltimore to install street lamps. On March 1, 1905, free mail delivery began in Gainesville, and on August 10, 1910, the Gainesville post office was opened. On December 22, 1915, the city's first high-rise, the Jackson Building, had its formal opening. In 1919 Southern Bell made improvements to the phone system.

City services began in Gainesville on February 22, 1873, with the election of a City Marshal, followed by solid waste collection in 1874. In 1890, a bond issue to fund the waterworks was passed, and the original water distribution system was developed.

In 1943, at the height of World War II, Gainesville contributed to the war effort by leasing the airport to the US government for $1.00. The military used it as a naval air station for training purposes. In 1947, the airport was returned to the city of Gainesville, improved by the addition of two  landing strips (one of which was later lengthened to ).

After World War II, a businessman named Jesse Jewell started the poultry industry in north Georgia. Chickens have since become the state's largest agricultural crop. This $1 billion a year industry has given Gainesville the title "Poultry Capital of the World".

In 1956, the U.S. Army Corps of Engineers constructed Lake Sidney Lanier, by building Buford Dam on the Chattahoochee River. During the 1996 Summer Olympics, Gainesville served as the venue for the rowing and kayaking medal competitions, which were staged on Lake Lanier.

Gainesville gained accreditation of its Parks and Recreation Department in 2001. This was the third department in the state to be accredited. The Lakeside water treatment plant opened in 2002. The city has sponsored new social activities, including the Spring Chicken Festival in 2003, the Art in the Square gathering in 2004, and "Dredgefest" in 2008.

2008 saw the reopening of the Fair Street Neighborhood Center, the reopening of the Linwood Water Reclamation Facility Grand, and the completion of the Longwood Park Fishing Pier.

On January 28, 2021, a poultry plant in Gainesville leaked liquid nitrogen killing 6 and hospitalizing 12.

Geography

Gainesville is located in central Hall County at  (34.304490, -83.833897). It is bordered to the southwest by the city of Oakwood. Interstate 985/U.S. Route 23 passes through the southern part of the city, leading southwest  to Atlanta and northeast  to Baldwin and Cornelia. U.S. Route 129 runs through the east side of the city, leading north  to Cleveland and southeast  to Jefferson.

Nestled in the foothills of the Blue Ridge Mountains, parts of Gainesville lie along the shore of one of the nation's most popular inland water destinations, Lake Lanier. Named after Confederate veteran, Georgia author and musician Sidney Lanier, the lake was created in 1956 when the U.S. Army Corps of Engineers dammed the Chattahoochee River near Buford and flooded the river's valley. Although created primarily for hydroelectricity and flood control, it also serves as a reservoir providing water to the city of Atlanta and is a very popular recreational attraction for all of north Georgia.

Much of Gainesville is heavily wooded, with both deciduous and coniferous trees.

Climate
Much like the rest of northern Georgia, Gainesville has a humid subtropical climate (Köppen climate classification Cfa), with cool to mild winters and hot, humid summers.

Severe weather
While Gainesville does not sit in Tornado Alley, a region of the United States where severe weather is common, Supercell thunderstorms can sweep through any time between March and November, being primarily concentrated in the spring. Tornado watches are frequent in the spring and summer, with a warning appearing at least biannually, occasionally with more than one per year.

Tornado activity in the Gainesville area is above Georgia state average and is 108% greater than the overall U.S. average. Gainesville was the site of a deadly F4 on June 1, 1903, which killed 98 people. Gainesville was the site of the fifth deadliest tornado in U.S. history in 1936, in which Gainesville was devastated and 203 people were killed. In April 1974, an F4 tornado 22.6 miles away from the Gainesville city center killed six people and injured thirty. In December 1973, an F3 tornado 2.1 miles away from the city center injured twenty-one people.  Both storms caused between $500,000 and $5,000,000 in property damages.

Transportation

Major roads

  Interstate 985 
 State Route 347
  U.S. Route 23
  U.S. Route 129
  U.S. Route 129 Business
  State Route 11
  State Route 11 Business
  State Route 13
  State Route 53
  State Route 53 Connector
  State Route 60
  State Route 60 Connector
  State Route 284
  State Route 365
  State Route 369

Pedestrians and cycling

 Highlands to Island Trail (Under construction)
 Midtown Greenway
 Wilshire Trails

Mass transit
 The Gainesville Amtrak station is situated at 116 Industrial Boulevard. Amtrak's Crescent train connects Gainesville with the cities of New York, Philadelphia, Baltimore, Washington, Greensboro, Charlotte, Atlanta, Birmingham and New Orleans. The southbound train arrives on Saturday, Monday, and Wednesday mornings, and the northbound train on Sunday, Tuesday, and Thursday evenings.
Gainesville connection was replaced by WeGo in 2021.

Airport
 Lee Gilmer Memorial Airport (GVL), built in 1940, is a city-owned airport with two runways (5,500 ft and 4,001 ft), and supports air taxi operations, itinerant operations, local operations, and military operations. Aircraft include 116 single engine aircraft, 21 multi-engine aircraft, 2 jet engine aircraft and 1 helicopter. In addition, Gainesville has three heliports, Beaver Trail, Lanier Park Hospital and Latham Creek.

Economy

Poultry farming
The poultry farming industry in Gainesville began to develop after World War II, when Jesse Jewell, a Gainesville feed salesman, began his business. The format he developed was to sell North Georgia farmers baby chicks and feed on credit. When the chicks were grown, Jewell would buy back the adult chickens (broilers) at a price that would cover his costs and guarantee farmers a profit. Once Jewell signed on enough farmers to produce broilers for him, he invested in his own processing plant and hatchery.

As of 2013, poultry farming remains a significant economic driver in Gainesville, representing six of its top ten employers (7,600 employees), nearly one-quarter of the total population in the city in 2010 (and a higher proportion of the working-age population). It is the most well-known business in the area, with statewide revenue exceeding $3 billion. These jobs have attracted numerous Hispanic workers, adding to the diversity of families in the city and county. The proportion of Hispanic and Latino residents is more than 40 percent of the city's population, where the jobs are.

Top employers
According to Gainesville's 2012 Comprehensive Annual Financial Report, the top employers in the city are:

Culture

Arts and theater
Gainesville is the home of the Gainesville Theater Alliance (GTA), which is a partnership between Brenau University, the University of North Georgia, Theatre Wings, and the Professional Company. This coalition provides theatrical entertainment for the entire Gainesville area. GTA utilizes both professional and student actors in its productions and their performances have been nationally acclaimed.

The Northeast Georgia History Center is a museum established by Brenau University in Downtown Gainesville that focuses on the heritage of the Northeast Georgia region. Some notable exhibits include the Land of Promise and Northeast Georgia Sports Hall of Fame.

The Arts Council is a non-profit organization focused on providing Gainesville residents with a broad variety of visual, performing, and literary arts. The Atlanta Symphony Orchestra has been known to perform at this location. The Arts Council is located in the Smithgall Arts Center, which is a former two-story train depot that the Arts Council purchased from CSX Transportation in 1992.

The Quinlan Visual Arts Center is a non-profit arts association initially founded as the Gainesville Arts Association in 1942. The Quinlan Visual Arts Center acts as an exhibit, with multiple galleries on display throughout the year, as well as an event center. It is also an affiliate of the Arts Council and provides art classes for both children and adults.

The Gainesville Symphony Orchestra (GSO) was a volunteer orchestra founded in 1982 as the Lanier Symphony Orchestra. However, due to a lack in funding during the Great Recession, the GSO shut down in 2013 after almost 30 years of operation.

Gainesville is also home to the Gainesville Ballet Company which is a partnership with Brenau University and the Gainesville School of Dance. One of their more popular performances throughout the year is Tchaikovsky's The Nutcracker.

Alta Vista Cemetery is a graveyard located just outside Downtown Gainesville. The famous Confederate general James Longstreet is buried here. Other notable gravesites include: several Georgia governors, an astronaut, a rocket scientist, a circus performer, and that of poultry pioneer Jesse Jewell (whom Jesse Jewell Parkway, Gainesville's main thoroughfare, is named after).

Demographics

2020 census

As of the 2020 United States census, there were 42,296 people, 13,314 households, and 8,796 families residing in the city.

2010 census
As of the census of 2010, there were 33,804 people, 11,273 households, and 7,165 families residing in the city. The population density was 1.161.6 people per square mile (450.7/km). The racial makeup of the city was 54.2% White, 15.2% African American, 0.6% Native American, 3.2% Asian, 0.2% Pacific Islander, 23.4% from other races, and 3.2% from two or more races. Hispanic or Latino of any race were 41.6% of the population.

There were 11,273 households, out of which 30.3% had children under the age of 18 living with them, 39.3% were married couples living together, 18.2% had a female householder with no husband present, and 36.4% were non-families. 28.9% of all households were made up of individuals, and 3.64% had someone living alone who was 65 years of age or older.  The average household size was 2.85 and the average family size was 3.55.

Age distribution was 33.9% under the age of 20, 9.5% from 20 to 24, 29.2% from 25 to 44, 16.7% from 45 to 64, and 10.5% who were 65 years of age or older.  The median age was 29.5 years. For every 100 females, there were 91.6 males.  For every 100 females age 20 and over, there were 84.4 males.

The median income for a household in the city was $38,119, and the median income for a family was $43,734. Males had a median income of $26,377 versus $20,531 for females. The per capita income for the city was $19,439.  About 24.9% of families and 29.1% of the population were below the poverty line, including 40.7% of those under age 18 and 17.6% of those age 65 or over. In May 2013, the unemployment rate was 6.9%, less than the overall rate in Georgia of 8.3%, the US of 7.6%

Of the population aged 15 years and over, 31.0% have never been married; 50.0% are now married; 2.4% are separated; 7.7% are widowed; and 9.9% are divorced.

Healthcare
Gainesville is home to the Northeast Georgia Medical Center which houses the Georgia Heart Center and Level 1 Trauma Center.

Government and infrastructure
Arrendale State Prison of the Georgia Department of Corrections is a women's prison located in unincorporated Habersham County, near Alto, and in the Gainesville area.

Education
Three African Americans, Beulah Rucker, E. E. Butler, and Ulysses Byas were educational pioneers in Gainesville and Hall County. Rucker founded Timber Ridge Elementary School, the first school for Black children in Gainesville, in 1911. In 1951 she established a night high school for African-American veterans, which was the only High School for veterans in Georgia. E. E. Butler served as an educator for just one year before earning his Physician's license. In 1954, he became one of two who became the first Black men on the Gainesville City Schools Board of Education, a very unusual situation in the United States. When the schools were integrated in 1969, Byas, like most Black school principals was offered a demotion. Rather than take a job as an assistant principal at Gainesville High School, he moved to Tuskegee, Alabama, where he became the nation's first Black school superintendent.

Historical schools
E. E. Butler High School was a segregated school created in 1962 in response to court demands for equalization of resources for Black students. After the integration of public schools, it was closed in 1969.

Gainesville City School District
The Gainesville City School District holds pre-school to grade twelve, and consists of five elementary schools, a middle school, and a high school. The district has 282 full-time teachers and over 4,438 students.  Its lone high school, Gainesville High School boasts several notable alumni, including Deshaun Watson, Texans quarterback, Cris Carpenter, former professional baseball player (St. Louis Cardinals, Florida Marlins, Texas Rangers, Milwaukee Brewers), Tasha Humphrey, professional basketball player, and Micah Owings, current professional baseball player (Arizona Diamondbacks, Cincinnati Reds, San Diego Padres). The mascot for Gainesville High School is the Red Elephant.

Hall County School District
The Hall County School District holds pre-school to grade twelve, and consists of twenty-one elementary schools, six middle schools, and seven high schools. The district has 1,337 full-time teachers and over 21,730 students. The high schools in this district have produced a number of notable alumni including, Connor Shaw, starting quarterback for the University of South Carolina Gamecocks football team; Casey Cagle, Lt. Governor, State of Georgia; James Mills, Georgia State Representative; A.J. Styles, professional wrestler; Deshaun Watson, starting quarterback for the Houston Texans, Mike "MoonPie" Wilson, former NFL football player; Chester Willis, former NFL football player; Jody Davis, former catcher for Chicago Cubs and Atlanta Braves baseball teams; Billy Greer, bass guitarist for progressive rock band Kansas; Corey Hulsey, former NFL Oakland Raiders football player; Robin Spriggs, author and actor; and Martrez Milner, American football tight end.

Private education

Gainesville has three private schools: Riverside Military Academy which is a private, college preparatory, boarding and day school for boys in grades 7 through 12; Lakeview Academy, a private, nondenominational, college preparatory school; and Brenau Academy, a female, college preparatory, residential school for grades 9–12, which is a part of the Brenau University system.

Higher education
Gainesville has several institutions of higher education: University of North Georgia (formerly Gainesville State College), which was established January 8, 2013, as a result of the consolidation of North Georgia College and  State University and Gainesville State College; Brenau University, a private, not-for-profit, undergraduate- and graduate-level higher education institution; the Interactive College of Technology; and Lanier Technical College.

Law
The Public Defender's Office at Gainesville has been recognized as one of the best in the state of Georgia. Established in 2005, the office provides representation for persons accused of felony offenses in Hall County.  Attorneys from the office have been recognized for their community involvement, as well as for their acumen in the courtroom.  In 2008, a first-year attorney successfully challenged the Sex Offender Registration Law in the Georgia Supreme Court.

Notable people

Tommy Aaron, professional golfer, 1973 Masters champion
Mariah Paris Balenciaga, drag queen and television personality, best known for RuPaul's Drag Race (season 3)
Ashley D. Bell, American politician
Jodi Benson, voice actress for Princess Ariel in Disney's The Little Mermaid
Roy D. Bridges, Jr., astronaut
Casey Cagle, Former Lieutenant Governor of Georgia 2007–2019
Rod Cameron, actor
Allen D. Candler, Governor of Georgia
Cris Carpenter, former Major League Baseball pitcher
Daniel Carver, former Ku Klux Klan Grand Dragon
John Casper, astronaut
Doug Collins member of the United States House of Representatives
Jason Cross, professional wrestler
Henry Crowder, professional jazz musician
Jody Davis, professional baseball player
Nathan Deal, 82nd Governor of Georgia, grew up in Millen
Dexter Fowler, Major League Baseball center fielder for the St. Louis Cardinals
Jentezen Franklin, Pastor
Chan Gailey, former head coach of the NFL's Dallas Cowboys/Buffalo Bills and the NCAA's Troy State/Georgia Tech football clubs
John Driskell Hopkins, bassist for the Zac Brown Band
Corey Hulsey, football guard for the Detroit Lions
Tasha Humphrey, Washington Mystics basketball player
A.J. Johnson current Denver Broncos linebacker; former University of Tennessee linebacker
T.J. Jones, current Detroit Lions wide receiver; former University of Notre Dame wide receiver
Sung Kang, actor
James Longstreet, Controversial Confederate general and Gainesville postmaster; grew up in Gainesville and moved there from New Orleans in 1875
Reg Murphy, former president and vice chairman, National Geographic Society; publisher, Baltimore Sun; editor and publisher, San Francisco Examiner; editor, Atlanta Journal-Constitution
Alexander R. Nininger, World War II Medal of Honor recipient, Battle of Bataan 
Micah Owings, Major League Baseball pitcher
Randy Pobst, professional racing driver
Robert Prechter, financial forecaster (1980s "Guru of the Decade")
Blake Sims, former University of Alabama Quarterback
James Milton Smith, Governor of Georgia
AJ Styles, professional wrestler signed to WWE
Deshaun Watson, American football quarterback for the Cleveland Browns
Margaret Woodrow Wilson, daughter of US President Woodrow Wilson
Mike Wilson, former National Football League offensive lineman

See also

1936 Tupelo–Gainesville tornado outbreak

References

External links

City of Gainesville official website
Greater Hall Chamber of Commerce

 
Cities in Georgia (U.S. state)
Cities in Hall County, Georgia
County seats in Georgia (U.S. state)
Populated places established in 1818
1818 establishments in Georgia (U.S. state)
Populated lakeshore places in the United States